Reyes del Show is the season three of the 2016 edition of El Gran Show premiered on October 29, 2016.

On December 17, 2016, model & reality TV star Rosángela Espinoza and Lucas Piro were crowned champions, axé star Thiago Cunha and Thati Lira finished second, while actress & singer Fiorella Cayo and Jimy García finished third. This was Espinoza's second victory, making her the second participant in the show's history to win two seasons, after Belén Estévez. At the same time, Piro became the first professional dancer to win two seasons.

Cast

Couples 
The participating couples of this season were conformed by the first three positions of the first and second season. Even so, it was announced that two new couples will enter the competition, these were presented during the first week, being Thiago Cunha and Thati Lira and the Reyes del Show of 2015 winners, Yahaira Plasencia and George Neyra.

Previous seasons

Host and judges 
Gisela Valcárcel and Aldo Díaz returned as hosts while Miguel Arce not returned. Morella Petrozzi, Carlos Cacho, Michelle Alexander, Pachi Valle Riestra and the VIP Jury returned as judges. Due to an accident suffered by his mother, Cacho could not be present during the second, fifth and eighth week.

Scoring charts 

Red numbers indicate the sentenced for each week
Green numbers indicate the best steps for each week
 the couple was eliminated that week
 the couple was safe in the duel
  the couple was eliminated that week and safe with a lifeguard
 this couple withdrew from the competition
 the winning couple
 the runner-up couple
 the third-place couple

Average score chart 
This table only features qualified dances on a 40-point scale.

Highest and lowest scoring performances 
The best and worst performance in each dance according to the judges' 40-point scale are as follows:

Couples' highest and lowest scoring dances 
Scores are based upon a potential 40-point maximum.

Weekly scores
Individual judges' scores in the charts below (given in parentheses) are listed in this order from left to right: Morella Petrozzi, Carlos Cacho, Michelle Alexander, Pachi Valle Riestra, VIP Jury.

Week 1: Acrobatic Salsa Night 
The couples danced acrobatic salsa. This week none couples were sentenced.

Due to an injury, Lucas Piro was unable to perform, so Rosángela Espinoza danced with troupe member Freddy Reyes instead.
Running order

Week 2: Tributes Night 
The couples performed a dance to pay tribute to different artists. In the versus, only three couples faced dancing acrobatic bachata, the winner would take two extra points plus the couples who gave their support votes.
Running order

Week 3: Doble Dance Night 
The couples (except those sentenced) performed a double dance. In the little train, only the women faced dancing reggaeton.
Running order

The duel*
Leslie & Oreykel: Eliminated 
Milett & Patricio: Safe

Week 4: Switch-Up Night 
The couples (except those sentenced) danced jive with a different partner selected by the production. In the versus, only three couples faced dancing Bollywood, the winner would take two extra points plus the couples who gave their support votes.celebrities, decided to support them.
Running order

The duel*
Milett & Patricio: Safe
Melissa & Sergio: Eliminated

Week 5: Trio Dances Night 
The couples (except the sentenced ones) performed a trio dance involving another celebrity. In the versus, Rosángela & Lucas faced to the former contestants Belén Estévez & Waldir Felipa dancing an acrobatic double dance; the winner would take two extra points plus the couples who gave their support votes.

At the beginning of the program, the retirement of Milett Figueroa and Patricio Quiñones was announced, who would not continue competing for Figueroa's labor issues.
Running order

The duel*
Rosángela & Lucas: Safe
Yahaira & George: Eliminated (but safe with the lifeguard)

Week 6: Quarterfinals 
The couples danced cumbia (except those sentenced) and a dance improvisation which involved seven different dance styles, all being rehearsed during the week by the couples and only one being chosen by a draw in the live show.

Due to an injury that occurred minutes before the live show, Yahaira Plasencia could not dance, canceling the versus where she would face former contestant Maricielo Effio. In addition, Christian & Isabel decided not to dance during the second round. By regulation, both couples received the minimum score of the judges.
Running order

The duel*
Thiago & Thati: Safe
Fiorella & Jimy: Eliminated (but safe with the lifeguard)

Week 7: Semifinals 
The couples performed a favorite dance and cumbia.

Due to the Yahaira Plasencia's injury, former contestant Karen Dejo replaced her, losing and being eliminated in the duel. However, Christian & Isabel, who had been saved, were eliminated by production due to contractual infractions.
Running order

The duel*
Christian & Isabel: Safe
Karen & George: Eliminated

Week 8: Finals 
The couples danced freestyle, trio salsa involving another celebrity and viennese waltz.
Running order

Dance chart
The celebrities and professional partners will dance one of these routines for each corresponding week:
 Week 1: Salsa (Acrobatic Salsa Night)
 Week 2: One unlearned dance & the versus (Tributes Night)
 Week 3: Double dance & the little train (Doble Dance Night)
 Week 4: Jive & the versus (Switch-Up Night)
 Week 5: Trio dances & the versus (Trio Dances Night)
 Week 6: Cumbia & dance improvisation (Quarterfinals)
 Week 7: Favorite dance & cumbia (Semifinals)
 Week 8: Freestyle, trio salsa & viennese waltz (Finals)

 Highest scoring dance
 Lowest scoring dance
 Gained bonus points for winning 
 Gained no bonus points for losing
 Danced, but not scored
In Italic indicate the dance performed in the duel

Guest judges 
Since the beginning of this season, a guest judge was present at each week to comment on and rate the dance routines. In the last week were present ten guest judges, who together with the main judges determined the winning couple.

Notes

References

External links

El Gran Show
2016 Peruvian television seasons
Reality television articles with incorrect naming style